Ali Puli, also known as Alipili, is the attributed author of a number of 17th-century alchemical and hermetic texts. However, his historical existence is doubtful, and A.E. Waite went as far as to describe the work attributed to him as "forgery pure and simple in respect of age and authorship [which] may be left to stand at its value in the matter of content."

He is described as a Mauretanian Christian of Asiatic extraction - also variously as an Arab (because he was said to have written in Arabic), and a Moor.

Most probably, Ali Puli is the pseudonym of Johann Otto von Helwig (1654-1698), a German physician, alchemist and author.

Influence
The most influential work attributed to him is Centrum Naturae Concentratum. This work was purported to have been written originally in Arabic, though no Arabic version is extant. It was first published in German in 1682 by Johann Otto von Helwig. In 1694 a Dutch translation was published. It was first translated into English by Edmund Brice in 1696. It is most noted for the following passage:

This passage is cited by Waite as evidence of a spiritual mystical tradition within alchemy, and has been widely quoted, notably by the theosophist Madame Blavatsky (who misattributes him as Abipili).

The passage has been identified as a source of the Wiccan Charge of the Goddess produced by Gerald Gardner and later revised by Doreen Valiente. It is the oldest of the sources so identified.

References

Further reading

17th-century alchemists
17th-century occultists
Hermeticism
Theosophy
Pseudepigraphy